Jovana Nikolić (Serbian: Јована Николић; born 27 April 1989 in Belgrade, SR Serbia, Yugoslavia) is a Serbian figure skater. She is the 2005 Serbian national silver medalist. Nikolić is a two-season competitor on the Junior Grand Prix circuit.

Competitive highlights

External links
 

1989 births
Living people
Serbian female single skaters
Sportspeople from Belgrade